Ron Tripp (born April 22, 1953) is a World Sambo and Judo champion and the current general secretary of USA Judo. He is also a member of the board of directors of the United States Olympic Committee.

His name is well known in the MMA world, especially among Brazilian Jiu-Jitsu and submission grappling enthusiasts, as he is the only person to hold an official victory in competition over Brazilian Jiu-Jitsu legend Rickson Gracie. Tripp became America's first Merited and Distinguished Master of Sport in 1996. He was promoted to 6th dan by USA Judo in November 2006.

Biography
A native of Lake Orion, Michigan, and graduate of Hillsdale College and Palmer College of Chiropractic. The 6-foot, 205 pound Tripp excelled in both the sports of Judo and Sambo. Trained by Pat Burris, two-time Judo Olympian and Olympic Judo Coach, Tripp's fight career in judo lasted from 1982 to 1995. He is also a Doctor of Chiropractic and was an assistant wrestling coach at the University of Oklahoma under Hall of Fame Coach Stan Abel from 1979 to 1992. Tripp trained in Japan for six years, and during that time trained under World Judo Champion Chonosuke Takagi at NichiDai University, home of MMA star and Olympic Champion Makoto Takimoto and 2 Time All Japan Judo Champion June Konno. In 2006 he founded C3Fights, a professional MMA company, and personally trained C3Fighters at the USA Stars Training Center in Oklahoma City, Oklahoma and coached and cornered UFC Fighters Joe "Daddy" Stevenson and Melvin "The Young Assassin" Guillard at UFC events.

Career highlights
1970-1994: Competed in over 2,000 Judo, Sambo, and Wrestling matches.
1982-1994: Reportedly compiled a tournament record of over 900 wins.
1990: Submitted by Rigan Machado in 39 seconds, Pan Am finals
1993: Defeated Rickson Gracie by Uchimata in 47 seconds.
1994: At 41, defeated 24-year-old Andrew Bourdeau to win the FIAS World Heavyweight Championship of Sambo in Montreal, Canada.

The Rickson Gracie Fight
At the 1993 U.S. Sambo Championships in Norman, Oklahoma, Tripp faced undefeated Rickson Gracie of the Gracie Jiu-Jitsu family.  Tripp threw Gracie to the canvas by "Uchi mata" in 47 seconds, thus giving Tripp the win under FIAS International Sambo rules. Rickson disputed this loss, claiming he was misinformed of the rules of the event despite claiming to be a 2 time Pan American Sambo Champion.

Awards and titles
 1994 World Sambo Champion
 7-time World Medalist Sambo
 1989 World Judo Team Belgrade
 Merited Master of Sports
 Olympic Festival Judo Champion Open Division
 8-time Olympic Festival Medal winner
 Mifune Cup Team Bronze Medalist Open Division
 12-time Judo and Sambo National Champion and Pan American Champion
 Winner of the first Bart Conner Award Recognizing Oklahoma's Most Outstanding Athlete 1987
 2010 Recipient of the Annual Pioneers of Sambo by the American Sombo Association
 President of USA Judo 2000-2008
 Member of U.S. Olympic Committee 2000-2004
 Co-founder and President of C3Fights
 President of the Oklahoma Board of Chiropractic Examiners (1997–)
 District Director, Federation of Chiropractic Licensing Boards (2003–2009)
 Chairman of the FCLB Board of Directors 2008-2009
 Recipient of the FCLB George W. Ardvison Award 2010, Baltimore
 Vice-chairman of the Board of International Oil and Gas Holdings
Elected as a Director of the National Board of Chiropractic Examiners in May 2011

Footnotes

Sources
 Ron Tripp's International Judo Federation interview
 Ron Tripp's Hillsdale College Alumni Bio

1953 births
Living people
American chiropractors
American male judoka
American sambo practitioners
Hillsdale College alumni
Judoka trainers